The 1930 International University Games were organised by the Confederation Internationale des Etudiants (CIE) and held in Darmstadt, Germany. Held from 1–10 August, thirty nations competed in a programme of eight sports. Women competed only in the athletics and swimming events.

Sports

Athletics medal summary

Men

Women

Athletics medal table

Participating nations

References
World Student Games (Pre-Universiade) - GBR Athletics

Summer World University Games
Athletics at the Summer Universiade
International University Games
International University Games
International University Games
International athletics competitions hosted by Germany
Sport in Hesse
Darmstadt